The Sea Hound is an American radio adventure series that ran from June 29, 1942, to August 7, 1951. It began on the Blue Network June 29, 1942 – September 22, 1944, as a 15-minute serial for young audiences, featuring Ken Daigneau as Captain Silver of the ship The Sea Hound. Other members of the cast were Barry Thompson as Captain Silver, Bob Hastings as Jerry, and Alan Devitt as Kai. Doug Browning was the announcer. 

In 1946–47 it aired on the Mutual Broadcasting System. The program expanded to 30 minutes on ABC radio June 21–September 2, 1948, alternating with Sky King. It last aired June 26–August 7, 1951, on ABC.

Between 1942 and 1944, The Sea Hound was produced with Nelson A. Rockefeller's Office of the Coordinator of Inter-American Affairs and was part of a national program to strengthen inter-American relations. Broadcast five times a week, the serial related the adventures of Captain Silver and his sidekick Jerry as they pursued Nazi agents throughout the Western hemisphere. Every episode took place in a different Latin American country. To educate young listeners about each country's geography and strategic importance, the producers created Captain Silver's Sea Chart, a map that identified the vital products, flags and national heroes of each Latin American republic. Some 200,000 complimentary copies of Captain Silver's Sea Chart were distributed.

Episodes
Episodes of The Sea Hound include the following:
The Envelope
Trapped Below
In Ekekay-Chasing Phantom Ship
After Captain Boom Boom
Mystery Cargo-Looking for Wald
Phantom Raider-Escape
The Traitor
The Capture
The Escape
Hut of the Voodoo Queen
Magic Idol-God of Vengeance

Other media
The show spawned a short-lived comic book, and the 1947 Columbia Pictures serial, The Sea Hound, starring Buster Crabbe.

References

External links 
The Sea Hound at the Internet Archive
A detailed database and cover gallery of the Sea Hound Comics

American radio dramas
1940s American radio programs
Mutual Broadcasting System programs
NBC Blue Network radio programs
ABC radio programs
Radio programs adapted into comics
Radio programs adapted into films
World War II propaganda
1950s American radio programs
1942 radio programme debuts
1951 radio programme endings